The Fakr Ad-Din Mosque, also known as Masjid Fakhr Ad-Din, is the second oldest mosque in Somalia after Masjid al-Qiblatayn (Somalia). It is located in Hamar Weyne (literally "big Hamar") mogadishu, the oldest part of the city. It is believed to be the 7th oldest mosque in Africa.

Description

The mosque was built in 969 by Sultan Abu Bakr Fakr ad-Din of the Fakr ad-din dynasty, the first Sultan of the Sultanate of Mogadishu. 

Stone, including Indian marble and coral, were the primary materials used in the construction of the masjid. The structure displays a compact rectangular plan, with a domed mihrab axis. Glazed tiles were also used in the decoration of the mihrab, one of which bears a dated inscription.

Photographs of the Fakr ad-Din mosque feature in drawings and images of central Mogadishu from the late 19th century onwards. The mosque can be identified amidst other buildings by its two cones, one round and the other hexagonal.

See also
  Lists of mosques 
  List of mosques in Africa
  List of mosques in Egypt
Jama'a Xamar Weyne, Xamar Weyne
Awooto Eeday
Arba'a Rukun Mosque
Mohamed Al Tani
Jama'a Shingani, Shingani
Masjid al-Qiblatayn
Mosque of Islamic Solidarity

References

External links
ArchNet - Masjid Fakhr al-Din
Masjid Fakhr al-Din

Mosques in Somalia
13th-century mosques
Mosques completed in 1269